Natalie Peta Ward is an Australian politician. Ward is the Minister for Metropolitan Roads and Minister for Women's Safety and the Prevention of Domestic and Sexual Violence in the Perrottet ministry, since December 2021. She has been a Liberal member of the New South Wales Legislative Council since 21 November 2017, when she filled a casual vacancy caused by the resignation of The Hon. Greg Pearce. 

Ward had previously served as the Minister for Sport, Multiculturalism, Seniors and Veterans in the second Berejiklian ministry and the first arrangement of the Perrottet ministry between May and December 2021. Prior to her appointment to the ministry, Ward served as Parliamentary Secretary to the Attorney General and Chaired the Joint Select Committee on Coercive Control and the Joint Select Committee on Sydney's Night Time Economy. 

Ward is a commercial litigation lawyer of 20 years practice in large commercial firms, boutique practice and government regulatory financial services areas. She served on the board of Women Lawyers and is a member of the Rotary Club of Sydney. She is a former director of Australian Rugby Foundation.
 
Ward was formerly deputy chief of staff to NSW Minister for Finance and Services and Minister for the Illawarra, Greg Pearce. Her husband, David Begg, is a commercial lawyer and former president of Sydney Rugby Union.

Ward wanted to move to the Legislative Assembly at the 2023 New South Wales state election, but in a preselection contest for the ultra-safe Liberal seat of Davidson, in Sydney’s northern suburbs, she was defeated by Matt Cross, a former staff member for Mike Baird.

References

Living people
Members of the New South Wales Legislative Council
Liberal Party of Australia members of the Parliament of New South Wales
University of Adelaide alumni
Australian solicitors
Australian people of Welsh descent
Year of birth missing (living people)
21st-century Australian politicians